Evan John Bruinsma (born September 9, 1992) is an American professional basketball player for Manisa BB of the Turkish Basketbol Süper Ligi. Bruinsma usually plays as power forward.

Professional career

Donar (2017–2018)
On July 20, 2017, Donar of the Dutch Basketball League (DBL) signed Bruinsma to a 1-year contract. On November 16, 2017, Bruinsma was named the FIBA Europe Cup Top Performer of Round 4 after scoring 34 points and grabbing 10 rebounds to go for an index rating of 40, in a 94–56 win against Bosnian side Bosna. On November 16, Bruinsma was named Top Performer of the FIBA Europe Cup for the second time in the 2017–18 season. This time, he recorded 23 points and 9 rebounds in a 95–72 win over U BT Cluj-Napoca. On April 23, 2018, Bruinsma's season was honored with a place in the All-DBL Team. With the club, he won the DBL championship and the NBB Cup.

Falco (2018–2019)
In July 2018, Bruinsma signed with Falco Vulcano of the Hungarian NB I/A. With Falco, Bruinsma won the Hungarian national championship after sweeping Egis Körmend in the finals.

Medi Bayreuth (2019–2020)
On July 18, 2019, he has signed with Medi Bayreuth of the Basketball Bundesliga. In March, the season was suspended due to the COVID-19 pandemic. In May 2020, the club announced Bruinsma had left the team.

Hapoel Be'er Sheva (2020)
On May 14, 2020, Bruinsma signed a contract with Hapoel Be'er Sheva B.C. He averaged 18.0 points and 8.3 rebounds per game in 8 Winner League games.

Return to Falco (2020–2021)
On August 5, 2020, Bruinsma returned to his former team, Falco Szombathely.

Büyükçekmece Basketbol (2021–2022)
On August 7, 2021, Bruinsma signed with Büyükçekmece Basketbol of the Turkish Basketbol Süper Ligi.

Manisa BB (2022–present)
On June 2, 2022, he has signed with Manisa BB of the Turkish Basketbol Süper Ligi.

Career statistics

FIBA Europe Cup

|-
| style="text-align:left;"| 2017–18
| style="text-align:left;"| Donar
| 17 || 17 || 28.2 || .471 || .373 || .784 || 7.1 || 1.1 || .5 || .9 || 12.1
|-

References

External links
Detroit Mercy Titans bio

1992 births
Living people
American expatriate basketball people in Bulgaria
American expatriate basketball people in the Czech Republic
American expatriate basketball people in Germany
American expatriate basketball people in Hungary
American expatriate basketball people in Luxembourg
American expatriate basketball people in the Netherlands
American men's basketball players
Basketball players from Michigan
BBC Amicale Steinsel players
BC Rilski Sportist players
Büyükçekmece Basketbol players
Medi Bayreuth players
Detroit Mercy Titans men's basketball players
Donar (basketball club) players
Dutch Basketball League players
Falco KC Szombathely players
People from Oceana County, Michigan
Power forwards (basketball)
Tuři Svitavy players